Charles William Stuart Legget (born 21 January 1988) is a Scottish cricketer.  Legget is a right-handed batsman who bowls right-arm medium fast pace.  He was born in Edinburgh, Midlothian and educated at Merchiston Castle School.

While studying for his degree at Durham University, Legget made his first-class debut for Durham UCCE against Durham in 2008.  In his only first-class appearance for the university, he was dismissed for 4 runs in the university's first-innings by Graham Onions, with the university being bowled out for 76.  In Durham's only innings, he took the wickets of Phil Mustard and Mark Davies for the cost of 43 runs from 10 overs.

After University Legget joined forces with fellow Durham student, James Coe, to form a new cricket brand that is based in Edinburgh, Scotland. The brand, Legget & Coe, launched in July 2011 with one range of bat called "Legacy" and was highly rated with several cricketers in the UK. Through sponsoring the Carlton CC Summer Sixes and Edinburgh University Indoor Sixes the brand has become known throughout Scotland. During the summer of 2011, Legget & Coe introduced the "L&C 1 Stump Challenge" which can be seen on the website's videos. Legget & Coe is preparing for the much anticipated launch of a full range of soft leather gear in the "Legacy" range and will be introducing 2012's new range called "Prophecy".

References

External links
Legget & Coe
Charles Legget at ESPNcricinfo
Charles Legget at CricketArchive

1988 births
Living people
Cricketers from Edinburgh
People educated at Merchiston Castle School
Scottish cricketers
Durham MCCU cricketers
Alumni of Grey College, Durham